Natasha Sutherland (born 20 November 1970), is a South African actress. She is best known for her roles in the television serials Honeytown, Tarzan: The Epic Adventures and Scandal!. Apart from acting, she is also an author, motivational speaker and a counselor.

Personal life
Sutherland was born on 20 November 1970, in Durban, South Africa, the daughter of choreographers Geoffrey Sutherland and Kenlynn Sutherland (formally Ashby).

Sutherland was married to Steve Hofmeyr, a South African singer, songwriter, and TV presenter. They married on 1998 and she later divorced acrimoniously in 2008 citing Steve's 10-year relationship with fitness instructor Janine van der Vyver. The couple has two sons: Benjamin and Sebastian.

Career
Sutherland started her career in the early 1990s as a presenter of the children show Kideo. Then she acted in the soap opera, Egoli: The Place of Gold during her teen age in 1991. In 1996, she started her acting career with the two television serials: Honeytown and Tarzan: The Epic Adventures. After the success of those serials, she acted in the home movie Operational Delta in 1997. Meanwhile, she started to dominate the South Africa theater with several popular stage plays such as Gigi in 1992 and The Revlon Girl. In the meantime, she also directed music videos and worked as an editor of Finesse Magazine.

Apart from acting, Sutherland is also a public motivational speaker who travelled across the country as well international stages. She is also appointed as the brand ambassador for the South African Beauty brand 'Placecol' and 'DNB'. She is also a prolific author, which she wrote her first book Bittersweet. With her success as an author, she later wrote the books: Green and Blue in 2010 (her first children's book), Fairytale and Sprokie.

Filmography

References

External links
 
 Sutherland v Hofmeyr

Living people
1970 births
South African film actresses
South African television actresses
People from Durban